Reb Brown (born Robert Edward Brown; April 29, 1948) is an American former football player and actor. Brown is perhaps best known for playing the lead in the television film Captain America and the action war film Uncommon Valor. He is also known for the 1983 cult film Yor, the Hunter from the Future, regarded as a classic B-movie, as well as the sci-fi film Space Mutiny, and for the collaborations with director Bruno Mattei in the films Strike Commando and Robowar.

Early years
Brown's father was a policeman who had also been a singer. He grew up in the Los Angeles area and played football at Temple City High School. After graduating in 1966, he received a scholarship to play fullback at the University of Southern California during the 1967 season. He ended up losing the starting running back position to another student, O. J. Simpson, and Brown decided to transfer to another college in the Los Angeles area.

Acting career
Brown's acting career started in 1973, when he appeared in the films The Girl Most Likely to... and Sssssss. When he began acting, there was already a Robert Brown in the Screen Actor's Guild, so he took his initials, Reb, as his first name for acting. He later appeared in guest starring roles in several Universal Studios-produced television series, including Emergency!, Marcus Welby, M.D., Kojak, The Eddie Capra Mysteries, and The Rockford Files. He also appeared as Rebel, a southern boy who has a fight with Ralph Malph in Happy Days, and played Jim Bridger in the all-star miniseries Centennial. He also appeared in Three's Company as Elmo, a date for Chrissy Snow.

He also played Captain America in two made-for-TV films, Captain America and Captain America II: Death Too Soon, during the late 1970s, part of the same development deal that yielded the Lou Ferrigno vehicle, The Incredible Hulk. Although Brown is not the first actor to play the character, he is the first one to have the character's signature shield.

In the film, Big Wednesday (1978), Brown played the role of "Enforcer." He landed the supporting role of the only starting white member (as a freshman) of the team in the college basketball comedy, Fast Break (1979), starring Gabe Kaplan. In Paul Schrader's 1979 film Hardcore, he plays a bouncer in a neon-lit sex shop who throws George C. Scott into the street after Scott's character becomes rowdy.

In 1983, Brown landed a lead role in the cult film classic Yor, the Hunter from the Future, as well as Blaster, a Viet Nam veteran character who trains with other vets in a P.O.W. rescue operation in Uncommon Valor.

Critical acclaim for Brown came in the 1986 Australian film, Death of a Soldier, which was based on a true story. Starring James Coburn, Brown received a nomination for Best Lead Actor in a Dramatic Role by the Australian Film Institute for his portrayal of serial killer, Private Edward Leonski.

Brown later starred with Lou Ferrigno playing Vietnam War veterans/buddies in a pair of action films, Cage (1989) and Cage II (1994). Brown also appeared in Bruno Mattei's Strike Commando (1987) and Robowar (1988).

Brown has continued his career moving between television and feature films. He is perhaps best known for portraying the main character Dave Ryder in 1988's Space Mutiny, which was lambasted in an episode of Mystery Science Theater 3000.

He appeared in the third-season Miami Vice episode, "Viking Bikers from Hell," in which he played a sociopathic biker, avenging his buddy's recent death.

After not appearing on screen in eighteen years, Brown co-starred in the 2012 film, Night Claws.

Personal life
Brown married actress Cisse Cameron, who played his love interest in Space Mutiny.

Filmography

Film
Sssssss (1973) as Steve Randall
The Girl Most Likely to... (1973) (TV Movie) as Football Player
Earthquake (1974) as Boy on Motorcycle (Uncredited; scene filmed but not used in the theatrical release, but added back in the television version)
Big Wednesday (1978) as 'Enforcer'
Fast Break (1979) as Sam 'Bull' Newton
Captain America (1979) (TV Movie) as Steve Rogers / Captain America
Hardcore (1979) as Manager / Bouncer
Captain America II: Death Too Soon (1979) (TV Movie) as Steve Rogers / Captain America
Yor, the Hunter from the Future (1983) as Yor
Uncommon Valor (1983) as 'Blaster'
Howling II: Your Sister Is a Werewolf (1985) as Ben White
Death of a Soldier (1986) as Private Edward J. Leonski
White Ghost (1988) as Major Cross
Strike Commando (1987) as Michael Ransom
Space Mutiny (1988) as Dave Ryder
Robowar (1988) as Major Murphy Black
Mercenary Fighters (1988) as T.J. Christian
The Firing Line (1988) as Mark Hardin
Cage (1989) as Scott Monroe
Street Hunter (1990) as Colonel Walsh
Last Flight to Hell (1990) as Mitch Taylor
Cage II (1994) as Scott Monroe
Night Claws (2012) as Sheriff Kelly
Surge of Power: Revenge of the Sequel (2016) as Roger 'Star' Stevenson

TV
Kojak (1974) "Last Rites for a Dead Priest" as Furniture Man
Happy Days (1977) "Requiem for a Malph" as Rebel E. Lee
Hardy Boys Nancy Drew Mysteries (1977) "The Mystery of the Ghostwriters' Cruise" as Tony Rosselli
CHiPs (1977) 3 episodes as Brouillette Motorcycle Cop, Call Sign 'Mary 5. Episodes were: "Undertow", "Baby Food", and "Hustle".
Three's Company (1979) "Ralph's Rival" as Elmo Hacker
The Six Million Dollar Man as Soldier
Alice (1980) as Willy
Goldie and the Boxer Go to Hollywood (1981, TV movie) as Brian Kilpatrick / Johnny Gems
The Love Boat (1981) "Isaac's Teacher/Seal of Approval/The Successor" as Carl Williams
Miami Vice (1984) "Viking Bikers from Hell" as Reb Gustafson

References

External links
Official website

Reb Brown at Brian's Drive-In Theater

Male actors from Los Angeles
American male film actors
1948 births
Living people